

v

V.V.S.

va-ve

V-Cillin (Eli Lilly and Company)
vabicaserin (INN)
vadimezan (USAN, INN)
vadocaine (INN)
Vagigard 
Vagifem (Novo Nordisk)
Vagilia
Vagistat-1
Vagitrol
valaciclovir (INN)
valategrast (USAN, INN)
valconazole (INN)
Valcyte (Genentech)
valdecoxib (INN)
valdetamide (INN)
valdipromide (INN)
Valdoxan (Servier)
valganciclovir (INN)
valine (INN)
Valisone
Valium (Roche)
Valmid
Valnac
valnemulin (INN)
valnoctamide (INN)
valofane (INN)
valopicitabine (USAN, INN)
Valorin
valperinol (INN)
Valpin 50
valproate pivoxil (INN)
valproate semisodium (INN)
valproic acid (INN)
valpromide (INN)
Valrelease (Roche)
valrocemide (USAN)
valsartan (INN)
valspodar (INN)
Valstar (Endo Health Solutions)
Valtaxin (Anthra Pharmaceuticals)
valtorcitabine dihydrochloride (USAN)
valtrate (INN)
Valtrex (GlaxoSmithKline)
vamicamide (INN)
Vanamide (Sanofi)
Vanatrip 
Vancenase
Vanceril (Schering-Plough)
Vancocin
Vancoled
vancomycin (INN)
Vancor
vandetanib (USAN)
vaneprim (INN)
vaniprevir (USAN, INN)
Vaniqa
vanitiolide (INN)
Vanobid
vanoxerine (INN)
Vansil
Vanticon (AstraZeneca). Redirects to zafirlukast.
Vantin
vanutide cridificar (USAN, INN)
vanyldisulfamide (INN)
vapaliximab (INN)
vapiprost (INN)
vapitadine (INN)
Vapo-Iso
Vaponefrin
vapreotide (INN)
Vaprisol (Astellas Pharma)
vardenafil (INN)
varenicline tartrate (USAN)
varespladib (USAN)
varfollitropin alfa (INN)
Varivax
varlitinib (USAN, INN)
Vascor
Vascoray
Vaseretic
Vasocidin
VasoClear
Vasocon (CIBA Vision)
Vasodilan
vasopressin injection (INN)
Vasotec
Vasoxyl
vatalanib (USAN)
vatanidipine (INN)
vatelizumab (INN)
vatreptacog alfa (activated) (USAN)
Vaxigrip
vebufloxacin (INN)
Vectibix (Amgen)
Vectrin
vecuronium bromide (INN)
vedaclidine (INN)
vedaprofen (INN)
vedolizumab (USAN, INN)
Veetids
Veinamine
velafermin (USAN)
velaglucerase alfa (USAN)
velaresol (INN)
Velban (Eli Lilly)
Velcade
veliflapon (USAN)
velimogene aliplasmid (USAN)
veliparib (USAN, INN)
Velivet
velnacrine (INN)
velneperit (USAN, INN)
Velosef
Velosulin
Veltane (Lannett)
veltuzumab (USAN)
velusetrag (USAN, INN)
vemurafenib (INN)
venlafaxine (INN)
Venofer
venritidine (INN)
Ventaire
Ventavis (CoTherix, Inc.)
Ventolin. Redirects to Salbutamol.
vepalimomab (INN)
Vepesid (Bristol-Myers Squibb)
veradoline (INN)
veralipride (INN)
verapamil (INN)
verazide (INN)
Vercyte (Abbott)
Verdeso (Connetics Corporation)
Veregen (MediGene)
Verelan
Vergon
Veriloid
verilopam (INN)
verlukast (INN)
Verluma (Boehringer Ingelheim Pharma KG)
Vermidol
Vermizine
Vermox (Biotech Pharmaceuticals)
vernakalant
verofylline (INN)
Veronica
verpasep caltespen (USAN)
Versapen
Versed
Versel
versetamide (INN)
Versiclear
Vertavis
verteporfin
verubulin (USAN, INN)
verucerfont (USAN, INN)
Vesanoid (Roche)
vesencumab (INN)
Vesicare
vesnarinone (INN)
Vesprin
Vesicare (Astellas Pharma/GlaxoSmithKline)
vestipitant mesylate (USAN)
vetrabutine (INN)
Vexol (Alcon)